Haeundae I'Park is a complex of four skyscrapers in Haeundae District, Busan, South Korea consisting of three office towers and one residential tower. Tower 1 and 2 were both in the 20 tallest buildings completed in 2011. As of 2022, Tower 2 and Tower 1 are the eighth and 12th-tallest buildings in South Korea respectively.

References

External links
 Official Website
 Studio Libeskind project page
 Haeundae I Park Marina Tower 1 on CTBUH Skyscraper Center
 Haeundae I Park Marina Tower 2 on CTBUH Skyscraper Center
 Haeundae I Park Marina Tower 3 on CTBUH Skyscraper Center
 Haeundae I Park Marina Hotel on CTBUH Skyscraper Center

Buildings and structures in Busan
Daniel Libeskind buildings
Residential skyscrapers in South Korea
Skyscraper office buildings in South Korea